Ballad Best Singles: White Road is the fourth released greatest hits album from the Japanese rock band, Glay. The album peaked at #1 at Oricon charts, with 411,521 sales. It was certified Double Platinum (500,000) by the Recording Industry Association of Japan (RIAJ).

Track listing

Way of Difference
Soul Love
Beloved
Special Thanks
Blue Jean
Aitai Kimochi (逢いたい気持ち)
A Boy: Zutto Wasurenai (A Boy: ずっと忘れない)
However
Zutto Futari de... (ずっと2人で...)
Be with You
Winter, again
Toki no Shizuku (時の雫)
Tsuzureori: So Far and Yet So Close (つづれ織り So Far and Yet So Close)

References
 -Ballad Best Singles- White Road at Oricon

External links 
 Glay Official Site

Glay albums
2005 compilation albums
EMI Music Japan compilation albums